The 1979 Appalachian State Mountaineers football team was an American football team that represented Appalachian State University as a member of the Southern Conference (SoCon) during the 1979 NCAA Division I-A football season. In their ninth year under head coach Jim Brakefield, the Mountaineers compiled an overall record of 3–8 with a mark of 3–4 in conference play, and finished fifth in the SoCon. After their victory over Marshall in their season finale, Brakefield resigned as head coach of the Mountaineers.

Schedule

References

Appalachian State
Appalachian State Mountaineers football seasons
Appalachian State Mountaineers football